Eske is a hamlet in the East Riding of Yorkshire, England. It lies just to the east of the River Hull.

The hamlet forms part of the civil parish of Tickton.

Eske was the ancestral home of the Jackson family, beginning with Richard (1505?–1555). His great-grandson, Sir Anthony Jackson II was a prominent courtier with both Charles I and Charles II Stuart, and is interred at the Temple Church of the Inner Temple in London.

Eske Manor is a mid-17th-century house that was designated a Grade II* listed building in 1987 and is now recorded in the National Heritage List for England, maintained by Historic England.

References

External links

Villages in the East Riding of Yorkshire